Rapga may refer to

People
 Pandatsang Rapga

RAPGA may refer to:
Relevant Alleles Preserving Genetic Algorithm